Pagan Kennedy (born c. 1963) is an American columnist and author, and pioneer of the 1990s zine movement.

She has written ten books in a variety of genres, was a regular contributor to the Boston Globe, and has published articles in dozens of magazines and newspapers. In 2012–13, she was a New York Times Magazine columnist.

Early life and education
Born Pamela Kennedy around 1963, she grew up in suburban Washington, D.C. She graduated from Wesleyan University in 1984, and later spent a year in the Masters of Fine Arts program at Johns Hopkins University.

Career
Kennedy's autobiographical zine Pagan's Head detailed her life during her twenties.

Kennedy wrote a biography called The First Man-Made Man about Michael Dillon who in the 1940s was the first successful case of female-to-male sex change treatment; he established himself as a medical student. It describes how he later fell in love with a male-to-female transsexual, Roberta Cowell, who was at the time the only other transsexual in Britain. 

In July 2012, Kennedy was named design columnist for the New York Times Magazine. Her column, "Who Made That," detailed the origins of everything from the cubicle to the home pregnancy test. Kennedy resigned from the column after signing a contract with Houghton Mifflin Harcourt to write a book, Inventology. 

In 2020, Kennedy's investigation into the history of the first rape kit written for the New York Times, "The Rape Kit's Secret History," received national media attention. It led to a revival of interest surrounding Marty Goddard's story, including the auction of an early rape kit at Sotheby's.

Teaching
Kennedy was a visiting professor of creative writing at Dartmouth College, and taught fiction and nonfiction writing at Boston College, Johns Hopkins University, and many other conferences and residencies.

Personal life
An ovarian cancer survivor, Kennedy currently lives in Somerville, Massachusetts with her partner, Kevin Bruyneel. She previously lived with filmmaker Liz Canner, in a relationship she has described as similar to a Boston marriage.

Awards
Kennedy's accomplishments have been recognized many times during her career; she was a 2010 Knight Science Journalism fellow at the Massachusetts Institute of Technology, and was named the 2010/2011 Creative Nonfiction grant winner by the Massachusetts Cultural Council. She has also been the recipient of a National Endowment for the Arts fellowship in fiction, a Sonora Review fiction prize, and a Smithsonian Fellowship for science writing.

Bibliography

Novels
 Spinsters (1995) (Barnes & Noble Discover Award winner, shortlisted for 1996 Orange Prize) 
 The Exes (Simon & Schuster, 1998 )
 Confessions of a Memory Eater (Leapfrog Press, 2006 )

Collections
 Stripping, and other stories (Serpent's Tail, 1994 )

Nonfiction
 Platforms: A Microwaved Cultural Chronicle of the 1970s (St. Martin's Press, 1994 , reprinted by SFWP 2015)
 Zine: How I Spent Six Years of My Life in the Underground and Finally...Found Myself...I Think (St. Martin's Press, 1995; reprinted by SFWP 2014 )
 Pagan Kennedy's Living: Handbook for Ageing Hipsters (1997, reprinted by SFWP 2015)
 Black Livingstone: A True Tale of Adventure in the Nineteenth-Century Congo (2002, reprinted by SFWP 2013) (New York Times Notable list and  Massachusetts Book Award honors) 
 The First Man-Made Man: The Story of Two Sex Changes, One Love Affair, and a Twentieth-Century Medical Revolution (Bloomsbury, 2007 )
 The Dangerous Joy of Dr. Sex and Other True Stories (SFWP, 2008 )
 Inventology: How We Dream Up Things That Change the World (Houghton Mifflin Harcourt, 2016 )

Anthologies
 The Year's Best Fantasy and Horror Eighth Annual Collection (1995)
 The Best Creative Nonfiction Volume 2 (2008)

Short stories
 Elvis's Bathroom (1989)

References

External links
 
 Pagan Kennedy on Twitter
 Website for The Dangerous Joy of Dr. Sex
 Profile of Kennedy

1960s births
Living people
20th-century American novelists
21st-century American novelists
20th-century American women writers
21st-century American women writers
20th-century American short story writers
21st-century American short story writers
20th-century American non-fiction writers
21st-century American non-fiction writers
American memoirists
Place of birth missing (living people)
Wesleyan University alumni
Johns Hopkins University alumni
Writers from Washington, D.C.
American women novelists
American women memoirists